This is a list of films released in Japan in 1961. In 1961, there were 7231 movie theatres in Japan, with 4991 showing only domestic films and 1468 showing both domestic and imported films. In total, there were 535 Japanese films released in 1961. In total, domestic films grossed 29,445 million yen in 1961.

List of films

See also
1961 in Japan

References

Footnotes

Sources

External links
Japanese films of 1961 at the Internet Movie Database

1961
Lists of 1961 films by country or language
Films